Daddy's Gone A-Hunting is a 1969 American thriller film directed by Mark Robson and starring Carol White, Paul Burke, and Scott Hylands. Its title comes from the lullaby "Bye, baby Bunting".

This is the first film directed by Robson after his 1967 box-office hit Valley of the Dolls.

Plot
Cathy Palmer (White), a young British woman, comes to San Francisco to live. There she meets Kenneth Daly (Hylands), a relationship develops and she becomes pregnant, but when Cathy sees another side of Kenneth's personality, she elects to break off their engagement and abort the pregnancy.

Sometime later, Cathy meets and marries Jack Byrnes (Burke), who has political ambitions. Kenneth, however, continues to be disturbed by the way Cathy ended their romance, and soon comes back into her life. After Cathy gives birth to Jack's baby, Kenneth demands that she kill the child as retribution for the one she aborted earlier.

Cast
 Carol White as Cathy Palmer
 Paul Burke as Jack Byrnes
 Mala Powers as Meg Stone
 Scott Hylands as Kenneth Daly
 James Sikking as Joe Menchell
 Walter Brooke as Jerry Wolfe
 Matilda Calnan as Ilsa
 Gene Lyons as Dr. Blanker
 Dennis Patrick as Dr. Parkington
Rachel Ames as Dr. Parkington's Nurse
 Barry Cahill as FBI Agent Crosley

See also
 List of American films of 1969

References

External links

 

1969 films
1969 thriller films
American thriller films
Films scored by John Williams
Films about abortion
American films about revenge
Films about stalking
Films directed by Mark Robson
Films set in San Francisco
Films shot in San Francisco
American pregnancy films
Films with screenplays by Lorenzo Semple Jr.
Films with screenplays by Larry Cohen
1960s English-language films
1960s American films